Azimuth (branding itself as azimuth) is a Russian joint-stock company airline based in Platov International Airport in Rostov-on-Don, the capital of Rostov Oblast.

History
Due to the merger of Donavia with Rossiya Airlines in 2016, Rostov-on-Don lost its main airline, even though Rossiya continued the flights previously operated by Donavia. As Rostov-on-Don was selected as one of the host cities for the 2018 FIFA World Cup in Russia, there was a perceived need for another airline to provide quality flights to connect the cities of Southern Russia and Central Russia. Azimuth registered itself as a legal entity in Krasnodar, but re-registered itself in Rostov-on-Don in February 2017, with shareholders being co-owner of Vnukovo International Airport Vitaly Vantsev, Pavel Udod and Pavel Yekzhanov.

In March 2017, contracts were signed with for the delivery of four Sukhoi Superjet 100 (SSJ100) regional jets. Another contract was signed for the delivery of four more SSJ100s. The delivery of the aircraft began in July 2017, with the airline receiving its first SSJ100 on 7 July through the State Transport Leasing Company (GTLK). The airline plans to further increase the fleet to 16 aircraft. On 18 August 2017, the airline received an air operator's certificate (AOC) giving the airline permission to commence flight operations. Domestic routes to Kaliningrad, Chelyabinsk, Volgograd, Astrakhan, Surgut and Gelendzhik, as well as international routes to Yerevan, Prague, Frankfurt, Istanbul and Tel Aviv are planned to enter Azimuth's route network by 2021. On 7 December 2017, Azimuth officially shifted all flights from Rostov-on-Don Airport to Platov International Airport.

Azimuth officially started international flights on 29 September 2018 when it started offering weekly flights to Bishkek. Two days later, Azimuth had its first flight to Yerevan, starting a schedule now offering three services a week. The airline, which obtained its Air Operator’s Certificate (AOC) in August 2017, is exempt from the requirement that Russian airlines must demonstrate at least two years’ of successful domestic operations before being allowed to perform international services. This is due to the fact that the requirement does not apply to countries of the Eurasian Economic Union (EEU), of which Armenia and Kyrgyzstan are a part of.

In December 2019, after more than two years of successful operations, Azimuth started its first international flights outside the CIS, with flights to Tel Aviv started on 1 December and Munich starting on 22 December. In the same month, Azimuth reached its operational break-even point, citing government subsidies and high dispatch reliability to be main contributing factors of its success.

In 2020, Azimuth began regular flights to Crimea.

Azimuth announced that it is planning to purchase the larger Airbus A220-300 with a seating maximum of 149 passengers. On 29 April 2021, the airline confirmed its Airbus orders, for international flights usage. As of October 2022, the order had however been removed by Airbus. The already produced and fitted aircraft have been allocated to ITA Airways instead.

Corporate affairs and identity 
Azimuth is headquartered in Rostov-on-Don, Rostov Oblast. Shareholders of the airline include Vitaliy Vantsev, who owns Vnukovo International Airport and Pavel Udod, former owner of Yakutia Airlines. As of April 2017, Azimuth's CEO position is held by Pavel Yekzhanov. Azimuth's logo and livery was designed by Asgard Branding based from St. Petersburg. According to the designers, the logo symbolizes the sun, the sea, the sky and southern hospitality.

Destinations 
As of December 2019, Azimuth Airlines operates flights to 30 domestic destinations and three international destinations.

Fleet

As of July 2022, Azimuth operates an all-Sukhoi Superjet 100 fleet.

See also 
 Donavia
 List of airlines of Russia
 List of airports in Russia
 Transport in Russia

References

External links

 

Airlines of Russia
Russian companies established in 2017
Airlines established in 2017
Companies based in Rostov-on-Don